Louise Schatz (née Louise Burton McClure; 1916–1997) was a Canadian-born Israeli painter, ceramist, and textile designer. She is one of the best known abstract watercolorist from Israel. She was active in Berkeley, Big Sur, Haifa, and Jerusalem.

Biography  
Louise McClure was born in 1916 in Vancouver, British Columbia, Canada, to a family of English descent. Her father John "Jack" McClure was a vaudeville theatre director. Her mother Evelyn (née Burton) was a dental assistant. At the age of 3, her family moved to Minnesota to be closer to her paternal grandparents. As a result of the Great Depression the McClure family moved to the San Francisco Bay Area for work.

She attended the University of California, Berkeley, where she received a bachelor's degree in art in 1939. During World War II between 1943 to 1945, she worked as a draftsman at a shipyard in San Francisco. She was a member of the "Californian Group of Seven", a Big Sur artist collective from 1945 to 1948.

She married Bezalel "Lilik" Schatz in 1948, the son of sculptor Boris Schatz. In 1951, Bezalel and Louise emigrated to Israel, settling 5 years later in the artist village of Ein Hod. Their home in Ein Hod was designed by architect David Resnick. She did not speak Hebrew nor have strong connections to Israel, besides that of her husband's family. 

In 1951, Louise Schatz, Bezalel Schatz, and her sister-in-law Zahara Schatz formed a craft workshop "Yaad" in Israel, rooted in European-American modernism.

Her husband died in Jerusalem in 1978. She died in Jerusalem in 1997. Schatz's work is in museum collections including at the British Museum, and the Israel Museum, Jerusalem.

Personal life 
Louise had two sisters. Her sister Evelyn "Eve" Burton McClure, was the ex-wife of film director Jack Carr; actor Lyle Talbot; novelist Henry Miller; and sculptor Harry Dick Ross.

References  

1916 births
1997 deaths
University of California, Berkeley alumni
Artists from Berkeley, California
Artists from Jerusalem
Artists from Haifa
Artists from Vancouver
American people of Canadian descent
Israeli people of Canadian descent
People from Big Sur, California
American textile designers
20th-century Canadian women artists
20th-century Israeli women artists